Sphenophorus costicollis is a species of beetle in the family Dryophthoridae. It is found in North America.

Subspecies
These two subspecies belong to the species Sphenophorus costicollis:
 Sphenophorus costicollis callosipennis Chittenden
 Sphenophorus costicollis costicollis

References

Further reading

 
 

Dryophthorinae
Articles created by Qbugbot
Beetles described in 1919